Ma Lan (born 23 April 1962) is a Chinese performing artist of Huangmei opera who usually plays dan (female) roles. Before her abrupt (and unannounced) departure from the stage in 2000, Ma Lan was considered the most popular Huangmei opera performer in the country. She has won the Plum Blossom Award, the China TV Golden Eagle Award, and the Flying Apsaras Award, and performed on the CCTV New Year's Gala in 1984, 1987, 1988, 1992, 1997, and 2005. She is often compared to the 1950s/1960s superstar Yan Fengying, whom she movingly portrayed in a hit 1988 TV series.

Ma Lan is married to writer Yu Qiuyu. In a 2006 blog post, Yu Qiuyu blamed toxic workplace politics and corruption in Anhui Huangmei Opera Company for his wife's involuntary retirement at age 38. This post generated fervent discussions.

Biography
Ma Lan was born in Taihu County, Anhui, in 1962, and graduated from Anhui Acting Performance School in 1975, where she majored in the performance of Huangmei opera. Succeeding in her debut in 1980, she later created some vivid portrayals of famous characters, such as the artist Zhang Yuliang, Jia Baoyu in Dream of the Red Chamber, Zhu Yingtai in the Butterfly Lovers, Princess Yunhua in the Daughter of the Dragon King, Yan Fengying in Yan Fengying, and Cui Yingying in Romance of the Western Chamber. In 1987, she won the Plum Blossom Prize, and in 1988, she won the Golden Eagle Award for Best Actress and the Flying Apsaras Award for Outstanding Actress for her portrayal of Yan Fengying. Most of her performances are still considered as among the best examples of the art of Huangmei opera.

Repertoire

Filmography

Awards

Huangmei opera
Ma Lan received the prestigious Plum Blossom Award in 1987.

TV series

References

1962 births
Living people
People from Taihu County
Actresses from Anhui
Huangmei opera actresses
Singers from Anhui
Chinese television actresses
20th-century Chinese actresses
20th-century Chinese women singers